John Ford (1894–1973) was an American film director whose career spanned from 1913 to 1971. During this time he directed more than 140 films however nearly all of his silent films are lost. Born in Maine, Ford entered the filmmaking industry shortly after graduating from high school with the help of his older brother, Francis Ford, who had established himself as a leading man and director for Universal Studios. After working as an actor, assistant director, stuntman, and prop man – often for his brother – Universal gave Ford the opportunity to direct in 1917.  Initially working in short films, he quickly moved into features, largely with Harry Carey as his star. 

In 1920 Ford left Universal and began working for the Fox Film Corporation. During the next ten years he directed more than 30 films, including the westerns The Iron Horse (1924) and 3 Bad Men (1926), both starring George O'Brien, the war drama Four Sons and the Irish romantic drama Hangman's House (both 1928 and both starring Victor McLaglen).  In the same year of these last two films, Ford directed his first all-talking film, the short Napoleon's Barber.  The following year he directed his first all-talking feature, The Black Watch.

In 1931, Ford began working for other studios, starting with Arrowsmith for Samuel Goldwyn.  In 1934, he began a lengthy association with producer Merian C. Cooper at RKO Radio Pictures.  The following year he directed The Informer, which brought him his first Academy Award for Best Director and the Best Actor Award for its star, Victor McLaglen.  In 1939, Ford directed Stagecoach, which made John Wayne a major star and brought an Academy Award for Best Supporting Actor to Thomas Mitchell.  It was also the first time Ford filmed in Monument Valley. That same year Ford made Young Mr. Lincoln and Drums Along the Mohawk, both with Henry Fonda. The latter was Ford's first film shot in Technicolor.

In 1940 Ford made The Grapes of Wrath with Fonda and The Long Voyage Home with Wayne and Mitchell.  For the former film Ford received his second Academy Award for Best Director and the Best Supporting Actress for Jane Darwell.  He followed these films in 1941 with How Green Was My Valley, which won the Academy Award for Best Picture, brought Ford his third Academy Award for Best Director and the Best Supporting Actor Award to Donald Crisp.

With the coming of World War II, Ford was appointed to the Office of Strategic Services as a field photographer in the United States Navy. During the war he made several documentaries.  Two of these, The Battle of Midway and December 7th, won Academy Awards for, respectively, Best Documentary and Documentary Short Subject.  After being released from active duty he returned to Hollywood to make They Were Expendable (1945) a war drama of PT boats in the South Pacific. He followed this with My Darling Clementine (1946), starring Henry Fonda as Wyatt Earp. 

In 1949, Ford also made his only foray into live theatre by directing a charity production of What Price Glory? Ford freelanced for the remainder of his career, directing occasionally for television and making several films including The Man Who Shot Liberty Valance and the Civil War sequence of the Cinerama epic How the West Was Won (both 1962).  Ford's final film as a director was Chesty (1970), a documentary short about Marine Corps lieutenant general Lewis "Chesty" Puller.

Ford is widely regarded as one of the most important and influential film-makers in history. Ingmar Bergman called him the greatest movie director of all time and Orson Welles regarded him highly. With four Academy Awards, he is the most honored director in film history. On February 8, 1960, Ford was awarded a star on the Hollywood Walk of Fame. On March 31, 1973, Ford was honored with the Medal of Freedom Award and became the first person honored with the AFI Life Achievement Award. In 2012, The Searchers was ranked at number seven in Sight & Sounds listing of the 50 greatest films of all time.

Films

This list of films is derived from the filmographies in Print the Legend: The Life and Times of John Ford by Scott Eyman and John Ford by Peter Bogdanovich.

From 1917 to 1923 Ford was credited as "Jack Ford". Beginning with Cameo Kirby (1923) he was credited as "John Ford". Unless otherwise noted, all films released up until 1922 were Universal Productions. Films released from 1922 to 1930 were Fox Productions. After 1930, each film's production company is individually noted.

All films are feature length unless identified as a serial or short film. The silent shorts are identified as one, two, or three reels in length.
{| class="wikitable sortable plainrowheaders" width="100%" style="font-size: 90%;"
! scope="col" width="3%" rowspan="2"|Year
! scope="col" width="15%" rowspan="2"|Title
! colspan="4" scope="col" |Functioned as
! scope="col" rowspan="2" width="35%" class="unsortable"|Notes
! scope="col" rowspan="2" width="2%" class="unsortable"|Ref
|-
! width="5%"|Director 
! width="5%"|Producer
! width="5%"|Actor
! width="5%"|Writer
|-
| 
| scope="row" |
| 
|
| 
| 
| With Jean Hathaway; two reels. Ford's directorial debut film; lost.
| align="center" |
|-
| 
| scope="row" |
| 
|
| 
|
| Two reels; lost.
| align="center" |
|-
| 
| scope="row" |
| 
|
| 
| 
| Two reels; lost.
| align="center" |
|-
| 
| scope="row" |
| 
|
|
|
| With Harry Carey, Molly Malone, Hoot Gibson; three reels; lost; Ford's first film with Carey and Gibson.
| align="center" |

|-
| 
| scope="row" |Straight Shooting
| 
|
|
|
| With Harry Carey; Ford's debut feature film.
| align="center" |
|-
| 
| scope="row" |
| 
|
|
|
| With Harry Carey; two of the five reels survive.
| align="center" |
|-
| 
| scope="row" |
| 
|
|
|
| With Harry Carey, Molly Malone; lost.
| align="center" |
|-
|-
| 
| scope="row"|Cheyenne's Pal
| 
| 
| 
| 
| With  Harry Carey, Gertrude Astor, Hoot Gibson; two reels; lost.
| align="center"|
|-
| 
| scope="row"|Bucking Broadway
| 
| 
| 
| 
| With Harry Carey, Molly Malone; released as a bonus on the Criterion blu-ray of Stagecoach.
| align="center"|
|-
| 
| scope="row" |
| 
|
|
|
| With Harry Carey, Molly Malone; lost.
| align="center" |
|-
| 
| scope="row" |Wild Women
| 
|
|
| 
| With Harry Carey, Molly Malone; story by Ford and Carey; lost.
| align="center" |
|-
| 
| scope="row" |Thieves' Gold
| 
|
|
|
| With Harry Carey, Molly Malone; lost.
| align="center" |
|-
| 
| scope="row" |
| 
|
|
| 
| With Harry Carey, Molly Malone; 30 minutes of footage survives.
| align="center" |
|-
| 
| scope="row" |Hell Bent
| 
|
|
| 
| With Harry Carey, Duke R. Lee; print survives in the George Eastman Museum.
| align="center" |
|-
| 
| scope="row" |
| 
|
|
|
| With Harry Carey, Betty Schade; lost.
| align="center" |
|-
| 
| scope="row" |Three Mounted Men
| 
|
|
|
| With Harry Carey; lost.
| align="center" |
|-
| 
| scope="row" |Roped
| 
|
|
|
| With Harry Carey, Neva Gerber; lost.
| align="center" |
|-
| 
| scope="row" |
| 
|
|
|
| With Pete Morrison, Hoot Gibson; two reels; lost.
| align="center" |
|-
| 
| scope="row" |
| 
|
|
|
| With Harry Carey; lost.
| align="center" |
|-
| 
| scope="row" |Rustlers
| 
|
|
|
| With Pete Morrison, Hoot Gibson; two reels; possibly directed by Reginald Barker; survival status unknown.
| align="center" |
|-
| 
| scope="row" |Bare Fists
| 
|
|
|
| With Harry Carey, Betty Schade; lost.
| align="center" |
|-
| 
| scope="row" |Gun Law
| 
|
|
|
| With Pete Morrison, Hoot Gibson; two reels; survival status unknown.
| align="center" |
|-
| 
| scope="row" |
| 
|
|
| 
| With Pete Morrison, Hoot Gibson; two reels; story by Ford and Harry Carey; survival status unknown.
| align="center" |
|-
| 
| scope="row" |By Indian Post
| 
|
|
|
| With Pete Morrison, Duke R. Lee; two reels; survives incomplete.
| align="center" |
|-
| 
| scope="row" |Riders of Vengeance
| 
|
|
| 
| With Harry Carey, Seena Owen; lost.
| align="center" |
|-
| 
| scope="row" |
| 
|
|
|
| With Edgar Jones, Lucille Hutton; two reels; only the first reel survives.
| align="center" |
|-
| 
| scope="row" |
| 
|
|
|
| With Harry Carey, Cullen Landis; based on the short story by Bret Harte; lost.
| align="center" |
|-
| 
| scope="row" |Ace of the Saddle
| 
|
|
|
| With Harry Carey, Duke R. Lee; lost.
| align="center" |
|-
| 
| scope="row" |Rider of the Law
| 
|
|
|
| With Harry Carey, Vester Pegg; lost.
| align="center" |
|-
| 
| scope="row" |
| 
|
|
| 
| With Harry Carey, J. Barney Sherry; Partially lost – 3 reels survive.
| align="center" |
|-
| 
| scope="row" |Marked Men
| 
|
|
|
| With Harry Carey; remade by Ford as The Three Godfathers (1948); lost.
| align="center" |
|-
| 
| scope="row" |
| 
|
|
|
| With James J. Corbett, Richard Cummings; Ford's first non-western film; lost.
| align="center" |
|-
| 
| scope="row" |
| 
|
|
|
| With Frank Mayo, Elinor Fair; lost.
| align="center" |
|-
| 
| scope="row" |Hitchin' Posts
| 
|
|
|
| With Frank Mayo; lost.
| align="center" |
|-
| 
| scope="row" |Just Pals
| 
|
|
|
| Fox films; with Buck Jones, Helen Ferguson; Ford's first film for Fox; prints survive.
| align="center" |
|-
| 
| scope="row" |
| 
|
|
|
| Fox films; with Buck Jones, Barbara Bedford; lost.
| align="center" |
|-
| 
| scope="row" |
| 
|
|
|
| With Harry Carey, Helen Ferguson; lost.
| align="center" |
|-
| 
| scope="row" |
| 
|
|
|
| With Harry Carey, Mignonne Golden; lost.
| align="center" |
|-
| 
| scope="row" |Desperate Trails
| 
|
|
|
| With Harry Carey, Irene Rich; lost.
| align="center" |
|-
| 
| scope="row" |Action
| 
|
|
|
| With Hoot Gibson, Francis Ford; lost.
| align="center" |
|-
| 
| scope="row" |Sure Fire
| 
|
|
|
| With Hoot Gibson, Molly Malone; lost.
| align="center" |
|-
| 
| scope="row" |Jackie
| 
|
|
|
| Fox films; with Shirley Mason, William Scott; lost.
| align="center" |
|-
| 
| scope="row" |Little Miss Smiles
| 
|
|
|
| With Shirley Mason, Gaston Glass; lost.
| align="center" |
|-
| 
| scope="row" |Silver Wings
| 
|
|
|
| With Mary Carr, Lynn Hammond; Ford directed the prologue only, the remainder of the film was directed by Edwin Carewe; lost.
| align="center" |
|-
| 
| scope="row" |
| 
|
|
|
| With Will Walling, Virginia True Boardman; only one reel survives.
| align="center" |
|-
| 
| scope="row" |
| 
|
|
|
| With Henry B. Walthall, Ruth Clifford; based on the poem by Hugh Antoine d'Arcy; lost.
| align="center" |
|-
| 
| scope="row" |Three Jumps Ahead
| 
|
|
| 
| With Tom Mix, Alma Bennett; lost.
| align="center" |
|-
| 
| scope="row" |Cameo Kirby
| 
|
|
|
| With John Gilbert, Gertrude Olmstead; Ford's first film credited as "John Ford".
| align="center" |
|-
| 
| scope="row" |North of Hudson Bay
| 
|
| 
|
| With Tom Mix, Kathleen Key; Ford has a bit part in the film; 40 minutes of footage survive.
| align="center" |
|-
| 
| scope="row" |Hoodman Blind
| 
|
|
|
| With David Butler, Gladys Hulette; lost.
| align="center" |
|-
| 
| scope="row" |
| 
| 
|
|
| With George O'Brien, Madge Bellamy; added to the National Film Registry in 2011.
| align="center" |
|-
| 
| scope="row" |Hearts of Oak
| 
|
|
|
| With Hobart Bosworth, Pauline Starke; lost.
| align="center" |
|-
| 
| scope="row" |Lightnin'
| 
|
|
|
| With Jay Hunt, Madge Bellamy, Wallace MacDonald.
| align="center" |
|-
| 
| scope="row" |Kentucky Pride
| 
|
|
|
| With Henry B. Walthall, Gertrude Astor.
| align="center" |
|-
| 
| scope="row" |Thank You
| 
|
|
|
| With Alec B. Francis, Jacqueline Logan, George O'Brien; lost.
| align="center" |
|-
| 
| scope="row" |
| 
|
|
|
| With George O'Brien, Billie Dove; lost.
| align="center" |
|-
| 
| scope="row" |
| 
|
|
|
| With Janet Gaynor, Leslie Fenton, J. Farrell MacDonald; print survives at the Museum of Modern Art.
| align="center" |
|-
| 
| scope="row" |
| 
|
|
| 
| With George O'Brien, Olive Borden.
| align="center" |
|-
| 
| scope="row" |
| 
|
|
|
| With George O'Brien, Janet Gaynor; one reel missing.
| align="center" |
|-
| 
| scope="row" |Upstream
| 
|
|
|
| With Nancy Nash, Earle Foxe; Once lost, but rediscovered in New Zealand.
| align="center" |
|-
| 
| scope="row" |Mother Machree
| 
|
|
|
| With Belle Bennett, Neil Hamilton, Victor McLaglen; Movietone sound (music and sound effects only); John Wayne's first film with Ford, albeit in an uncredited minor role; Wayne was also a prop man in this film; three reels survive.
| align="center" |
|-
| 
| scope="row" |Four Sons
| 
|
|
|
| With Margaret Mann, James Hall; Movietone sound (music, limited dialogue, and sound effects only); John Wayne in uncredited minor role.
| align="center" |
|-
| 
| scope="row" |Hangman's House
| 
|
|
|
| With Victor McLaglen, June Collyer; silent film; John Wayne in uncredited minor role.
| align="center" |
|-
| 
| scope="row" |Napoleon's Barber
| 
|
|
|
| With Otto Matieson, Natalie Golitzen; Short film; Ford's first all-talkie film; lost.
| align="center" |
|-
| 
| scope="row" |Riley the Cop
| 
|
|
|
| With J. Farrell MacDonald, Louise Fazenda; Silent film with synchronized music track.
| align="center" |
|-
| 
| scope="row" |Strong Boy
| 
|
|
|
| With Victor McLaglen, Leatrice Joy; Silent film with synchronized music track; Believed lost although a print may exist in Australia.
| align="center" |
|-
| 
| scope="row" |
| 
|
|
|
| With Victor McLaglen, Myrna Loy; Ford's first all-talkie feature.
| align="center" |
|-
| 
| scope="row" |Salute
| 
|
|
|
| With George O'Brien, Helen Chandler; Ward Bond (in his film debut) and John Wayne have uncredited roles.
| align="center" |
|-
| 
| scope="row" |Men Without Women
| 
|
|
| 
| With Kenneth MacKenna, Frank Albertson; John Wayne has an unbilled bit part; all-talkie film that "survives only in a bastardized version that replaces most of the dialogue with titles".
| align="center" |
|-
| 
| scope="row" |Born Reckless
| 
|
|
|
| With Edmund Lowe, Catherine Dale Owen.
| align="center" |
|-
| 
| scope="row" |Up the River
| 
|
|
| 
| With Spencer Tracy, Humphrey Bogart (both in their film debuts).
| align="center" |
|-
| 
| scope="row" |Seas Beneath
| 
|
|
|
| With George O'Brien, Marion Lessing.
| align="center" |
|-
| 
| scope="row" |
| 
|
|
|
| Fox; with Sally O'Neil, Alan Dinehart.
| align="center" |
|-
| 
| scope="row" |Arrowsmith
| 
|
|
|
| Goldwyn-United Artists; with Ronald Colman, Helen Hayes, Myrna Loy; United Artists; based on the novel by Sinclair Lewis; nominated – Academy Award for Best Picture.
| align="center" |
|-
| 
| scope="row" |Air Mail
| 
|
|
|
| Universal; with Ralph Bellamy, Gloria Stuart, Pat O'Brien.
| align="center" |
|-
| 
| scope="row" |Flesh
| 
|
|
|
| MGM; with Wallace Beery, Karen Morley, Ricardo Cortez.
| align="center" |
|-
| 
| scope="row" |Pilgrimage
| 
|
|
|
| Fox; with Henrietta Crosman, Heather Angel.
| align="center" |
|-
| 
| scope="row" |Doctor Bull
| 
|
|
|
| Fox; with Will Rogers, Marian Nixon.
| align="center" |
|-
| 
| scope="row" |
| 
|
|
|
| RKO Pictures; with Victor McLaglen, Boris Karloff.
| align="center" |
|-
| 
| scope="row" |
| 
|
|
|
| Fox; with Madeleine Carroll, Franchot Tone.
| align="center" |
|-
| 
| scope="row" |Judge Priest
| 
|
|
|
| Fox; with Will Rogers, Tom Brown, Anita Louise, Henry B. Walthall.
| align="center" |
|-
| 
| scope="row" |
| 
|
|
|
|  Columbia; with Edward G. Robinson, Jean Arthur.
| align="center" |
|-
| 
| scope="row" |
| 
|
|
|
| RKO Pictures; with Victor McLaglen, Heather Angel; based on the novel by Liam O'Flaherty, Academy Award for Best Director; Nominated – Best Picture.; added to the National Film Registry in 2018.
| align="center" |
|-
| 
| scope="row" |Steamboat Round the Bend
| 
|
|
|
| 20th Century Fox; with Will Rogers, Anne Shirley; Rogers' last film.
| align="center" |
|-
| 
| scope="row" |
| 
|
|
|
| 20th Century Fox; with Warner Baxter, Gloria Stuart.
| align="center" |
|-
| 
| scope="row" |Mary of Scotland
| 
|
|
|
| RKO Pictures; with Katharine Hepburn, Fredric March.
| align="center" |
|-
| 
| scope="row" |
| 
|
|
|
| RKO Pictures; with Barbara Stanwyck, Preston Foster.
| align="center" |
|-
| 
| scope="row" |Wee Willie Winkie
| 
|
|
|
| 20th Century Fox; with Shirley Temple, Victor McLaglen; originally release in sepiatone.
| align="center" |
|-
| 
| scope="row" |
| 
|
|
|
| Goldwyn-United Artists; with Dorothy Lamour, Jon Hall.
| align="center" |
|-
| 
| scope="row" |Four Men and a Prayer
| 
|
|
|
| 20th Century Fox; with Loretta Young, Richard Greene, David Niven.
| align="center" |
|-
| 
| scope="row" |Submarine Patrol
| 
|
|
|
| 20th Century Fox; with Richard Greene, Nancy Kelly.
| align="center" |
|-
| 
| scope="row" |Stagecoach
| 
| 
|
|
| Wanger-United Artists; with Claire Trevor, John Wayne; Ford's first sound Western and his first film shot in Monument Valley; nominated – Best Picture; nominated – Academy Award for Best Director.; added to the National Film Registry in 1995.
| align="center" |
|-
| 
| scope="row" |Young Mr. Lincoln
| 
|
|
|
| 20th Century Fox; with Henry Fonda; added to the National Film Registry in 2003.
| align="center" |
|-
| 
| scope="row" |Drums Along the Mohawk
| 
|
|
|
| 20th Century Fox; with Claudette Colbert, Henry Fonda, Edna May Oliver; based on the novel by Walter D. Edmonds; Ford's first film in color (Technicolor).
| align="center" |
|-
| 
| scope="row" |
| 
|
|
|
| 20th Century Fox; with Henry Fonda, Jane Darwell; based on the novel by John Steinbeck; Ford won an Academy Award for Best Director and Darwell won Best Supporting Actress; added to the National Film Registry in 1989.
| align="center" |
|-
| 
| scope="row" |
| 
| 
|
|
| Argosy-United Artists; with John Wayne, Thomas Mitchell; based on four one-act plays by Eugene O'Neill; Ford's first production made by his company, Argosy Productions.
| align="center" |
|-
| 
| scope="row" |Tobacco Road
| 
|
|
|
| 20th Century Fox; With Gene Tierney, Dana Andrews; based on the play by Jack Kirkland and the novel by Erskine Caldwell
| align="center" |
|-
| 
| scope="row" |How Green Was My Valley
| 
| 
|
|
| 20th Century Fox; with Walter Pidgeon, Maureen O'Hara, Donald Crisp, Roddy McDowall; based on the novel by Richard Llewellyn; Best Picture; Ford won an Academy Award for Best Director.; added to the National Film Registry in 1990.
| align="center" |
|-
| 
| scope="row" |Sex Hygiene
| 
|
|
|
| U.S. Army Signal Corps; 30-minute training film.
| align="center" |
|-
| 
| scope="row" |
| 
|
|
|
| War Activities Committee; with Donald Crisp, Henry Fonda; filmed in color; won the Academy Award for Best Documentary Feature.
| align="center" |
|-
| 
| scope="row" |Torpedo Squadron
| 
|
|
|
| Documentary short for the United States Navy; filmed in color.
| align="center" |
|-
| 
| scope="row" |December 7th
| 
|
|
|
| Documentary short for the United States Navy; co-directed by Lt. Gregg Toland, USNR; won the Academy Award for Documentary Short Subject
| align="center" |
|-
| 
| scope="row" |We Sail at Midnight
| 
|
|
|
| Documentary short for the United States Navy.
| align="center" |
|-
| 
| scope="row" |How to Operate Behind Enemy Lines
| 
|
| 
|
| Ford appears in this training film for the OSS.
| align="center" |
|-
| 1945
| scope="row" |They Were Expendable
| 
| 
|
|
| MGM; with Robert Montgomery, John Wayne, Donna Reed; nominated for two Academy Awards – Best Visual Effects (A. Arnold Gillespie, Donald Jahraus, Robert A. MacDonald, Michael Steinoreand),  Best Sound Recording (Douglas Shearer).
| align="center" |
|-
| 1946
| scope="row" |My Darling Clementine
| 
|
|
|
| 20th Century Fox, with Henry Fonda, Linda Darnell, Victor Mature; filmed in Monument Valley; added to the National Film Registry in 1991.
| align="center" |
|-
| 1947
| scope="row" |
| 
| 
|
|
| Argosy-RKO Pictures; with Henry Fonda, Dolores del Río.
| align="center" |
|-
| 
| scope="row" |Fort Apache
| 
| 
|
|
| Argosy-RKO Pictures; with John Wayne, Henry Fonda, Shirley Temple, John Agar; suggested by the short story "Massacre" by James Warner Bellah; the first film in Ford's "Cavalry trilogy"; filmed in Monument Valley.
| align="center" |
|-
| 
| scope="row" |
| 
| 
|
|
| Argosy-MGM; With John Wayne, Pedro Armendariz, Harry Carey Jr.; filmed in Technicolor; based on the novel by Peter B. Kyne; filmed on location in Death Valley; a remake of Ford's Marked Men.
| align="center" |
|-
| 
| scope="row" |She Wore a Yellow Ribbon
| 
| 
|
|
| Argosy-RKO Pictures; with John Wayne, Joanne Dru, John Agar; filmed in Technicolor; based on the short stories "The Big Hunt" and "War Party" by James Warner Bellah; film on location in Monument Valley; the second film in Ford's "Cavalry trilogy".
| align="center" |
|-
| 
| scope="row" |When Willie Comes Marching Home
| 
|
|
|
| 20th Century Fox; with Dan Dailey, Corinne Calvet.
| align="center" |
|-
| 
| scope="row" |Wagon Master
| 
| 
|
| 
|  Argosy-RKO Pictures; with Ben Johnson, Joanne Dru, Harry Carey Jr.; filmed on location in Moab, Utah.
| align="center" |
|-
| 
| scope="row" |Rio Grande
| 
| 
|
|
| Argosy-Republic Pictures; with John Wayne, Maureen O'Hara, Claude Jarman, Jr.; based on the short story "Mission with No Record" by James Warner Bellah; filmed on location in Moab, Utah; the final film in Ford's "Cavalry trilogy".
| align="center" |
|-
| 
| scope="row" |This is Korea!
| 
|
|
|
| U.S. Navy-Republic Pictures; filmed in color; documentary about the United States Navy and Marines during the Korean War.
| align="center" |
|-
| 
| scope="row" |
| 
| 
|
|
| Argosy-Republic Pictures; with John Wayne, Maureen O'Hara; filmed in Technicolor on location in Ireland; based on the short story by Maurice Walsh; Ford won an Academy Award for Best Director while Winton Hoch and Archie Stout won for Best Cinematography; added to the National Film Registry in 2013.
| align="center" |
|-
| 
| scope="row" |What Price Glory
| 
|
|
|
| 20th Century Fox; with James Cagney, Corinne Calvet, Dan Dailey; filmed in Technicolor; a remake of Raoul Walsh's 1926 film.
| align="center" |
|-
| 
| scope="row" |
| 
|
|
|
| Argosy-Republic Pictures; with Charles Winninger, Arleen Whelan.
| align="center" |
|-
| 
| scope="row" |Mogambo
| 
|
|
|
| MGM; with Clark Gable, Ava Gardner, Grace Kelly; filmed in Technicolor on location in Africa; based on the play Red Dust by Wilson Collison.
| align="center" |
|-
| 
| scope="row" |
| 
|
|
|
| Columbia Pictures; with Tyrone Power, Maureen O'Hara; filmed in CinemaScope and Technicolor.
| align="center" |
|-
| 
| scope="row" |
| 
|
|
|
| A 10-minute film in CinemaScope and Technicolor promoting Americans to by savings bonds.  Filmed on the set of The Long Gray Line.
| 
|-
| 
| scope="row" |Mister Roberts
| 
|
|
|
| Warner Bros.; with Henry Fonda, James Cagney, Jack Lemmon, William Powell; based on the play by Thomas Heggen and Joshua Logan; filmed in CinemaScope and Warnercolor; Ford was replaced by Mervyn LeRoy during production; Lemmon won the Academy Award for Best Supporting Actor.
| align="center" |
|-
| 1956
| scope="row" |
| 
| 
|
|
| C. V. Whitney Pictures-Warner Bros.; with John Wayne, Jeffrey Hunter, Vera Miles; based on the novel by Alan Le May; filmed in VistaVision and Technicolor on location in Monument Valley; added to the National Film Registry in 1989; ranked at number seven in ''Sight & Sounds listing of the 50 greatest films of all time in 2012.
| align="center" |
|-
| 
| scope="row" || 
|
|
|
| MGM; with John Wayne, Dan Dailey, Maureen O'Hara; filmed in Metrocolor.
| align="center" |
|-
| 
| scope="row" || 
|
|
|
| A short film in color for the U.S. Dept. of Defense about the USS Growler. 
| align="center" |
|-
| 
| scope="row" || 
|
|
|
| Warner Bros.; with Tyrone Power introducing three stories set in Ireland: "1921", "A Minute's Wait", and "The Majesty of the Law".  
| align="center" |
|-
| 
| scope="row" |So Alone| 
|
|
|
| Free Cinema-BFI; with John Qualen; 8-minute short film.
| align="center" |
|-
| 
| scope="row" || 
| 
|
|
| Columbia Pictures; with Spencer Tracy, Jeffrey Hunter.
| align="center" |
|-
| 
| scope="row" |Gideon's Day| 
|
|
|
| Columbia Pictures; with Jack Hawkins; made in England; filmed in Technicolor but originally released in the United States only in black and white.
| align="center" |

|-
| 
| scope="row" |Korea| 
|
|
|
|  A short film in color for the U.S. Dept. of Defense.
| align="center" |
|-
| 
| scope="row" || 
|
|
|
| Mirisch-Batjac-United Artists; with John Wayne, William Holden, Constance Towers; filmed in Deluxe Color
| align="center" |
|-
| 
| scope="row" |Sergeant Rutledge| 
|
|
|
| Warner Bros.; With  Jeffrey Hunter, Constance Towers, Woody Strode; filmed in Technicolor on location in Monument Valley.
| align="center" |
|-
| 1961
| scope="row" |Two Rode Together| 
| 
|
|
| Columbia Pictures; with James Stewart, Richard Widmark, Shirley Jones; filmed in Eastmancolor.
| align="center" |
|-
| 
| scope="row" || 
|
|
|
| Paramount Pictures; with John Wayne, James Stewart, Vera Miles, Woody Strode; based on the short story by Dorothy M. Johnson; added to the National Film Registry in 2007.
| align="center" |
|-
| 
| scope="row" |How the West Was Won| 
|
|
|
| MGM; with (in the Ford segment) John Wayne, George Peppard; filmed in Cinerama and Technicolor; Ford directed the Civil War segment while Henry Hathaway and George Marshall directed the film's other segments; added to the National Film Registry in 1997.
| align="center" |
|-
| 1963
| scope="row" |Donovan's Reef| 
| 
|
|
| Paramount Pictures;with John Wayne, Elizabeth Allen, Lee Marvin; filmed in Technicolor; Wayne's final acting performance in a Ford film.
| align="center" |
|-
| 1964
| scope="row" |Cheyenne Autumn| 
|
|
|
|  Warner Bros.; with Richard Widmark, Carroll Baker, James Stewart; filmed in Super Panavision 70 and Technicolor on location in Monument Valley
| align="center" |
|-
| 1966
| scope="row" || 
|
|
|
| MGM; with Anne Bancroft, Sue Lyon, Margaret Leighton; filmed in Panavision and Metrocolor.
| align="center" |
|-
| 1970
| scope="row" |Chesty: A Tribute to a Legend''
| 
|
|
|
| Documentary for the United States Marine Corp about General Lewis B. 'Chesty' Puller; narrated by John Wayne
| align="center" |
|}

Other film work 
All films are feature length unless identified as a serial or short film. The silent shorts are identified as one, two, or three reels in length.

Other media

Radio

Television

Stage

References
Notes

Footnotes

Bibliography

Ford, John